Die Letzten Drei der Albatross also known as  Mutiny in the South Seas is a 1965 German-Italian-French international co-production film directed by Wolfgang Becker.

Cast
Joachim Hansen
Harald Juhnke
Horst Niendorf
Gisella Arden
Jacques Bézard
Horst Frank
Philippe Guégan
Eva Montes
Alfredo Varelli

External links
 

1965 films
1965 adventure films
Italian adventure films
1960s German-language films
German adventure films
Films set in the Philippines
Films set on islands
World War II naval films
Films shot in the Philippines
Films directed by Wolfgang Becker (director, born 1910)
1960s Italian films
1960s German films
German-language Italian films